Heera Rajagopal is a former Indian actress who has appeared in a number of Tamil, Telugu, Kannada, Malayalam and Hindi language films.

Career
As a military brat, Heera shifted to schools across different states in India every few years. She later pursued a degree in psychology at Women's Christian College, Chennai. During her time in college, Heera was approached to model for print magazines and she took on the opportunities for financial independence. She also briefly worked as an encyclopaedia-seller, a hotel worker and a model coordinator in her days as a student. Heera was initially not keen for a career in films and turned down initial approaches for roles by film directors. She first received a film offer on a family holiday at Gulmarg in Kashmir, where a producer had approached her to play the body double for Tina Munim. She also later rejected an offer from filmmaker Subhash Ghai, who had attended one of her modelling assignments.

In 1991, soon after finishing college, Heera accepted to play the lead female role in Kathir's Tamil romantic drama film Idhayam. Despite her initial apprehensions, she was convinced by film producer T. G. Thyagarajan to become an actress, and she obliged, crediting the professional approach and continued determination of the film's team to sign her on. She portrayed a medical student, who does not notice her classmate's love for her, throughout the entire film. The film performed well at the box office, and has since been discussed as a "cult film" in Tamil cinema. Heera's second film Nee Pathi Naan Pathi (1991), was directed by Vasanth and produced by Kavithalayaa Productions. She then starred in four films opposite actor Sarathkumar in quick succession, before playing a single mother in Sabash Babu (1993), written by T. Rajender.

Heera was cast by Mani Ratnam in his caper film Thiruda Thiruda (1993), and portrayed a rural belle who becomes a thief on the run, alongside actors Prashanth and Anand. A critic from The New Indian Express wrote there was "a drastic change of image from her hitherto sophisticated roles" and that she enacts it "so successfully". She later debuted in Bollywood through Raj Sippy's Amanaat (1994) co-starring Sanjay Dutt and Akshay Kumar. The film had a delayed release, after being impacted by Dutt's criminal litigation process.

In the mid-1990s, Heera continued to act in high-profile Tamil productions, though often as one of several female lead actresses. She notably appeared in Balu Mahendra's comedy drama Sathi Leelavathi (1995), alongside an ensemble cast including Kamal Haasan, Ramesh Aravind and Raja. She portrayed a corporate manager in Agathiyan's Kadhal Kottai (1996), co-starring Ajith Kumar and Devayani. The film performed well at the box office, and went on to win several National Film Awards. She later featured in a supporting role opposite Kamal Haasan in K. S. Ravikumar's comedy drama Avvai Shanmugi (1996).

Heera opted to quit the film industry in late 1999 citing she did not want to "succumb to the inevitable pressures" to play roles that did not appeal to her intellect sensibilities.

Filmography

References

Year of birth missing (living people)
Living people
Actresses in Tamil cinema
Actresses in Malayalam cinema
Indian film actresses
Actresses in Telugu cinema
Actresses in Kannada cinema
Actresses from Chennai
Women's Christian College, Chennai alumni
20th-century Indian actresses
Actresses in Tamil television